"Tribute (Right On)" is the debut single by English group the Pasadenas, from their 1988 debut album To Whom It May Concern. The song was a hit, reaching No. 1 in the Netherlands and Belgium, No. 5 on the UK Singles Chart, No. 26 in Germany, No. 14 in France and No. 45 in New Zealand. In the U.S., the song peaked at No. 52 on the Billboard Hot 100, No. 8 on the R&B chart, and No. 27 on the Dance Club Songs chart.

References

1988 songs
1988 debut singles
The Pasadenas songs
Columbia Records singles
Number-one singles in the Netherlands